The UCD Bowl, also known as the Belfield Bowl, is a rugby union and football stadium in Dún Laoghaire–Rathdown, Ireland. It is the home ground of University College Dublin R.F.C. in the AIB All Ireland League and League of Ireland Premier Division side University College Dublin A.F.C. It has also hosted training sessions for the Ireland national rugby union team and various touring international teams including the All Blacks. It was one of the venues for the 2017 Women's Rugby World Cup.

With its redevelopment complete, it now has capacity for 3,000 people, including 1,500 seats. It is located to the north of the Belfield campus beside the National hockey stadium, near the Sports Centre. There is a single stand on the southern side of the stadium with uncovered standing room at each end. 860 seats in the stand are covered.

Redevelopment
A substantial programme of improvements to the Bowl was started in 2007 after a decision was made to move the UCD football team from their home in Belfield Park as the Bowl would not meet the requirements of UEFA licensing for the League of Ireland. The redevelopment was confirmed in 2006 after a €1.25 million Sports Capital grant was allocated to the work and objections to planning were overruled. The seated capacity increased from 860 to 1,500 and a hard surface laid to allow standing capacity around the pitch. Floodlights, improved fencing around the stadium and facilities for shops, toilets and turnstiles were also added. The work was finished in late 2007 in time for the 2008 League of Ireland season. Planning permission has been applied for to replace the current roof with a cantilever structure which will cover all 1,500 seats. Eventually, the stadium is planned to have a capacity of 4,500 seats although there is no time scale laid out for this yet. UCD's record attendance at the venue was 1,986 for the visit of Shamrock Rovers in October 2010.

It was one of the venues for the 2017 Women's Rugby World Cup.

External links

 UCD A.F.C.
 UCD Rugby
 photos of the UCD Bowl

References

Belfield, Dublin
Buildings and structures in Dún Laoghaire–Rathdown
Association football venues in the Republic of Ireland
Rugby union stadiums in Ireland
Sports venues in Dún Laoghaire–Rathdown
Sport at University College Dublin
University College Dublin R.F.C.
University College Dublin A.F.C.
Association football venues in County Dublin